The 2010 Intercity Football League is the fourth season of the Intercity Football League since its establishment in 2007. It started on April 10, 2010. 

The promotion and relegation regulations used in the 2009 season were cancelled. The 2010 season had only one division. In addition, the league competitions were separated into 2 rounds. A total of 9 teams competed in the first round, and the best 6 would be qualified to the second round.

Famed Taiwanese semiconductor design company MediaTek became the league's major sponsor right before the round 2 began. Therefore, it is also called the MediaTek Intercity Football League.

Teams

Round 1

Round 2
Teams played each other once. Points were added to points accumulated in Round 1.

Champions qualify to 2011 AFC President's Cup.

References

External links
 2010 MediaTek Intercity Football League official blog 
 Season on soccerway.com

Top level Taiwanese football league seasons
Intercity Football League seasons
Taipei
Taipei
1